James Henry Martin (August 10, 1927 – May 14, 2005) was an American bluegrass musician, known as the "King of Bluegrass".

Early years
Martin was born in Sneedville, Tennessee, United States, and was raised in the hard farming life of rural East Tennessee. He grew up near Sneedville, singing in church and with friends from surrounding farms. His mother and stepfather who used to sing gospel were his first influences. When he was in his teens he played guitar in a local string band and later appeared on radio with Tex Climer and the Blue Band Coffee Boys.

Music career
In the winter of 1949, Mac Wiseman had just left Bill Monroe's Blue Grass Boys. Martin, who wanted to apply for the vacant post as guitarist, rode the bus into Nashville. He snuck in backstage at the Grand Ole Opry. While picking his guitar, he was overheard by the Blue Grass Boys' banjo player Rudy Lyle, who brought him forward and presented him to Monroe. Martin sang two songs with Monroe and was hired.

Beginning in 1949, Martin was lead vocalist for Bill Monroe's Blue Grass Boys. Martin's high voice mixed with Monroe's tenor came to be known as the "high lonesome" sound. His influence radically changed Monroe's music from the fast-paced but smooth style of the "original" 1945 band with Flatt and Scruggs. Martin challenged Monroe to raise the pitch on many of his classics and to write new, "lonesome" songs. This band with Rudy Lyle (banjo) and Charlie Cline (fiddle) was one of the many high points of Monroe's career. Martin's lead was defining in "lonesome" songs such as "Sitting Alone in the Moonlight", "Memories of Mother and Dad" and "I'm Blue, I'm Lonesome".

Martin had a famously high-strung and exuberant personality, and inevitably clashed with Monroe's equally stubborn temperament. He left Monroe and worked briefly with the Osborne Brothers until he formed his own band, The Sunny Mountain Boys, in 1955. The classic line-up of this band, with J. D. Crowe and "Big" Paul Williams (stage name for Paul Humphrey), defined his "Good 'n Country" style, a commercially oriented, crowd-pleasing bluegrass with simple harmonies, catchy melodies, and a strong rhythm propelled by Martin's effective guitar playing. He credited himself with inventing the "G" run, a guitar lick used widely in the bluegrass genre. However, aural evidence from the period before Martin began performing professionally, clearly shows Lester Flatt using this run when backing Bill Monroe.

Three important components of Martin's unique sound, besides his cutting tenor voice, were tight trio singing, sometimes a female high-baritone fourth part, and the use of a snare drum in place of mandolin to keep the back-beat.

Among Martin's biggest hits of the 1960s were "Hit Parade of Love", "Sophronie", "Stepping Stones", "Tennessee", and "Widow Maker" (a popular truck driver's song). His instrumentals (with the Sunny Mountain Boys), such as "Theme Time", "Bear Tracks" and "Red Rooster", featured ultra-crisp playing by a series of banjo players including Sam "Porky" Hutchins, J.D. Crowe, Vernon McIntyre Jr. and Bill Emerson, and, powered by Martin's guitar runs, set a standard for bluegrass instrumentals that was influential.

In the 1960s and 1970s, Jimmy Martin's Sunny Mountain Boys included singer and instrumentalist Gloria Belle, who is considered the first female lead singer in bluegrass.  She toured Japan with Martin during 1975. In regards to her playing, Martin said jokingly, "She's not very good, but we let her sing with us 'cause we feel sorry for her."

Martin was famous as a dangerously unpredictable, but highly entertaining stage presence. He freely acknowledged his problems with drinking and volatile mood swings, which kept him from realizing his lifelong dream of joining the Grand Ole Opry.

He made frequent appearances on the Louisiana Hayride and Wheeling, West Virginia's WWVA Jamboree (renamed Jamboree U.S.A. in the 1960s), as well as the Grand Ole Opry, but was never invited to join the latter. In 1973, he performed on Bill Monroe's Brown County Jamboree.

He performed on the Nitty Gritty Dirt Band's 1971 album, Will the Circle Be Unbroken, as well as Volume II (1989) and Volume III (2002).

He joined producers Randall Franks and Alan Autry for the In the Heat of the Night cast CD Christmas Time's A Comin''', performing "Christmas Time's A Comin'" with the cast on the CD released on Sonlite and MGM/UA.

Death
Martin died in Nashville on May 14, 2005, after having been diagnosed with bladder cancer more than a year earlier. He is interred in the Spring Hill Cemetery in Nashville's Madison neighborhood. A report of his death in the Toronto Star called him "one of the greatest vocalists in bluegrass."

Legacy
In 1995, Martin was inducted into the International Bluegrass Music Hall of Honor. A documentary on his life, King of Bluegrass: The Life and Times of Jimmy Martin, was released in 2003.  Martin is also featured in the documentary film High Lonesome.

Martin's hobby was raccoon hunting with dogs; he featured his hunting dogs on the covers of several LP albums and wrote songs celebrating their prowess. His troubles with the Nashville music industry are memorialized in "The Death of Jimmy Martin", a song by Tom Russell on The Wounded Heart of America'' album.

Discography

Albums

Singles

Guest singles

See also
Thomas Edd Mayfield

References

External links
Discography at Discography of Bluegrass Sound Recordings
And yet another Discography; 
NAMM Oral History Interview with Jimmy Martin July 22, 2004
 

1927 births
2005 deaths
People from Hancock County, Tennessee
Deaths from bladder cancer
American male singer-songwriters
Bluegrass musicians from Tennessee
American country singer-songwriters
King Records artists
RCA Victor artists
Deaths from cancer in Tennessee
Country musicians from Tennessee
Music of East Tennessee
Musicians from Appalachia
Burials in Tennessee
20th-century American singers
Singer-songwriters from Tennessee
20th-century American male singers